Vilhonneur is a former commune in the Charente department in southwestern France. On 1 January 2019, it was merged into the new commune Moulins-sur-Tardoire.

History
Vilhonneur was located on the Angoulême-Limoges Roman road, which was also known as the "English Road" (chemin des Anglais).

The Rochebertier tower is mentioned in a confession to Philip the Bold in 1276. A medieval castle, of which exist only traces of the foundations, is located on a hillock. The present castle was built by the Chambes (aka Jambes) family in the late sixteenth century.

Population

Sights
The town has two prehistoric caves of an exceptional nature.

The Placard cave, at Rochebertier, was discovered in 1853 and has been dated to the Magdalenian  and Solutrean periods. New paintings were discovered in 1990, identical to those in the Pech Merle cave at Lot.

The "Face" cave (grotte du Visage) was discovered in November 2005 during a caving expedition. It contains engravings as well as human and animal bones dating from the Upper Paleolithic period (around 25 000 years BCE).

At the site of the old Roman ford there is still the 50 cm-wide stone bridge, which was characteristic of the Tardoire and Bandiat valleys.

See also
Communes of the Charente department

References

Former communes of Charente